Parish Pump was a series of articles that ran between January 1971 and September 1975 in The Country Gentleman's Association monthly magazine. Written by Julian Grey, the articles detailed life in a fictional East Anglian village between the 1930s and the 1970s.

Brief overview 
 "Ancient men full of guile, bigotry and craftsmanship supping from chipped mugs at an ancient settle, they are long gone. No Parish Pump remains the same forever, and ours - like all the others - has had to change with the times." (Jan 72)

Grey is a writer and a townie, and as such is initially  viewed with much suspicion by the mainly agrarian natives when he arrives in 1937. However, over time he is accepted as a harmless, if dilettante, member of the community. He brings his family up and sees the village change as technology and social change reach the depths of the countryside.

Location 
The centre of the drama is unnamed, but referred to as the community around the Parish Pump. This is one of three satellite hamlets surrounding the more dominant Greater Seething. They in turn feed into a market town called Steepleborough (May 1975). A parish council still exists

Within the village
 The Parish Church, dedicated to St Mary, the Blessed Virgin (August 1973)
 One Non-Conformist Chapel ( Sept 75)
 The Village Hall (May 72)
 A post office ( Jan 73)
 An unadopted spur, Watchitt Green (May 72)
 Poacher's Wood ( Oct 75)
 The Greensward (Jan 71; passim)
 none of which approach in importance the true hub of the community, The Star and Wheelbarrow

Dramatis Personnae 

Unnamed characters
These  include
The Squire: a distant and unobtrusive patriarch
The General: retired Indian army with obligatory Labrador in tow
The Vicar: earnest muscular Christian
a Planter from Burma, and his wife
The Editor of a Fine Arts Magazine
A Hungarian lorrydriver
Two drunk servicemen

Plot Summaries 
The series ran from bi-monthly in 1971 and 72; then again in 1974 and 75; in 1973 a shorter, but monthly, article, appeared.

1971
Jan pages 6 to 9: Introductory article - why strong walls make good neighbours
Mar p95-97: An exotic London couple make their homes in the village
Jul p275-277: Grey spars with his taciturn, obstinate gardener
Sep p368-370: Deadly intrigue at the Horticultural Show
Nov p445-447: A widow plans to sell a small meadow for development

1972
Jan p9-11: A description of the village's original 3 pubs, now reduced to 1
Mar p83-86: the uses the thriving village hall is put to
May p148-151: The unadopted part of the village lobbies to be incorporated
Jul p213-226: the village handyman is departing, much to everyone's dismay
Sep p303-306: a local bachelor strikes lucky at the local races
Nov p 453-456: The Sunday Newspaper "Boy" ( aged 86) retires

1973
Jan p14-15: The Post Office Noticeboard
Feb p74-75: A tenant farmer is selling up
Mar p144-146: Mid week routines
Apr p210-212: A new pub sign is universally disliked
May p270-272: The Grey's faithful "Lady that does" quits
Jun p338-340: A popular local "Beatt Combo" split
Jul p400-402: The growing "Week-enders" trend
Aug p464-465: A young Scion marries into money
Sep p535-537: The Cricketing feats of yesteryear
Oct p593-595: Organised poaching gangs visit at night
Nov p656-658: A thatcher refuses to take no for an answer
Dec p726-728: The new vicar causes concern

1974
 Jan p10-12: How Grey moved in one frosty New Year's Eve
 Mar p149-151: A portrait of the General
 May p272-274: A Hungarian tractor driver is well and truly lost
 July p385-387: An exact repeat (although not acknowledged) of the July 1973 article
 Sept p540-542: An Irish girl comes to work at the Grey's
 Nov p659-661: Two old comrades refuse to walk a quarter of a mile to see one another

1975
 Jan p14-16: Two very different soldiers are stranded in the village on New Year's Eve
 Mar p149-151: The pub's ancient settle is removed to make way for a fruit machine
 May p269-271: A portrait of the village's charismatic former G.P
 July p394-396: A former G.I. settles in the village and tweaks some time-honoured customs
 Sept p486-488: A description of the rivalry between the village and its larger neighbour

 "There is no great amity, just a polite acceptance of the other's existence." (Sept 75)

References

Magazine articles
Fictional populated places in England